Karawatha Forest or Karawatha nature reserve is approximately 900 hectares of bushland in the Brisbane suburbs of Karawatha and Stretton, Australia. It is one of the largest areas of remnant bushland within Brisbane.  The predominant vegetation types in the forest are dry eucalypt forest and woodland with native heath understories.  The Karawatha Forest Protection Society was formed to ensure that the bushland was protected from development and is owned and managed by the Brisbane City Council (BCC). Funds raised from the BCC's Bushland Preservation Levy have enabled the acquisition of land for preservation of Karawatha Forest.

The subtropical bushland reserve contains an important wetland area along Scrubby Creek and an unnamed creek, both of which flow into Slacks Creek, tributary of the Logan River. Significant landmarks within the forest include Poet's Rock, the Old Quarry, Curtisii (formerly Paratz) Lookout, "the Rocks," Frog Hollow and the Illaweena Lagoon system. Along the western edge of the forest is the Gateway Motorway.

The reserve was first declared in 1906.

Fauna
The wetlands provides habitat for a number of threatened and endangered species including the powerful owl, glossy black cockatoo and the green thighed frog. Also found within the park are the red-necked wallaby, swamp wallaby and eastern grey kangaroo.  While not threatened or endangered the reserve is home to greater gliders, squirrel gliders and sugar gliders.

Wildlife movement corridor

In the south of the reserve wildlife movement infrastructure consisting of a land-bridge over Compton Road has been a success. The Compton Road fauna overpass is the most intensively studied in the country.  It links the forest to the northern Kuraby bushland.  The corridor also included two fauna underpasses, three rope ladders and a line of glider poles.

Research

Karawatha forest was one of two sites in Australia at which a PPBio Research Grid was established and completed.  The project was undertake from  	
1 July 2009 to 31 December 2013.

Recreation
Camping is not permitted. Horse riding and motorbikes are banned. Two picnic areas with tables and drinking water taps are provided for visitors. The picnic areas are open to the public between the hours of 6 am and 7 pm. There is also a disused quarry that people frequent for a swim during the hotter months.

See also 

 Flora of Brisbane
 Forests of Australia

References

External links

 Karawatha Forest Protection Society

Forests of Queensland
Nature reserves in Queensland
Tourist attractions in Brisbane
1906 establishments in Australia